Igor Valeryevich Zakurdayev (born January 26, 1987) is a skier who competed in Alpine Skiing in Vancouver 2010 and Sochi 2014. He was born in Ridder, Kazakhstan.

References
 Igor Zakurdaev at www.vancouver2010.com 
 

1987 births
Living people
Alpine skiers at the 2010 Winter Olympics
Alpine skiers at the 2014 Winter Olympics
Alpine skiers at the 2018 Winter Olympics
Kazakhstani male alpine skiers
Olympic alpine skiers of Kazakhstan
Place of birth missing (living people)
Asian Games medalists in alpine skiing
Alpine skiers at the 2007 Asian Winter Games
Alpine skiers at the 2011 Asian Winter Games
Asian Games gold medalists for Kazakhstan
Asian Games silver medalists for Kazakhstan
Medalists at the 2011 Asian Winter Games
Alpine skiers at the 2017 Asian Winter Games
People from Ridder, Kazakhstan